Julie Johnson is an American politician from the state of Texas. She serves in the Texas House of Representatives for District 115.

Career 
Johnson defeated incumbent Republican Matt Rinaldi in the 2018 elections. She is one of Dallas County's first two openly gay elected officials, and the first member of the Texas House with a spouse of the same gender.

In 2021, Johnson and the Texas House Democratic Caucus left the state, traveling to Washington D.C., and later to Portugal, in order to delay voting on any new bills in a special July session. Texas House Republicans voted to arrest the elected members to compel their attendance, though they did not have the jurisdiction to do so.

References

Living people
Democratic Party members of the Texas House of Representatives
Women state legislators in Texas
LGBT state legislators in Texas
Lesbian politicians
21st-century American politicians
1966 births
21st-century American women politicians